Start-Up is a South Korean television series starring Bae Suzy, Nam Joo-hyuk, Kim Seon-ho and Kang Han-na. The series revolves around a woman who has dreams of becoming an entrepreneur like Steve Jobs, and her love triangle between a man who is secretly her first love and another man who is pretending to be her first love. It aired on tvN from October 17 to December 6, 2020, every Saturday and Sunday at 21:00 (KST). It is available for streaming on Netflix.

Synopsis
Set in South Korea's fictional Silicon Valley called Sandbox, Start-Up tells the story of people in the world of startup companies.

Seo Dal-mi (Bae Suzy) is a bright and ambitious young woman who dreams of becoming Korea's Steve Jobs. Dal-mi doesn't have a fancy background but she's passionate about her work. She has bright energy and is a person of great vitality, having experience in a wide range of part-time jobs.

Nam Do-san (Nam Joo-hyuk), is the founder of Samsan Tech. A ‘math genius’, or genius savant, as a young boy, Do-san was once the pride of his family but became their shame now, as his business has been going down for the past two years. He finds out that Dal-mi mistakenly remembers him as a secret pen pal whom she thinks of as her first love, so he decides to work his way up in hopes of turning that misunderstanding into reality.

Cast

Main
 Bae Suzy as Seo Dal-mi
 Heo Jung-eun as young Seo Dal-mi
 She dreams of becoming Korea's Steve Jobs. She was born to a humble family and lives with her grandmother. However, she's also an adventurer who has a grand plan for herself. Her drive also came from being abandoned by her mother and sister at a young age. She also has experience in a wide range of part-time jobs and is a person of great vitality. 
 Nam Joo-hyuk as Nam Do-san
 Kim Kang-hoon as young Nam Do-san
 Do-san is the founder of Samsan Tech. He was once the pride of his family as a math genius, but he is now shy and cannot even look people in the eye. After having had no business success in the past two years with his two programmer friends, he is almost ready to give up. Because of his name, Seo Dal-mi mistakenly believes him to be her ‘cool first love’ although they had never met. He decides to begin a startup in the hope of turning Seo Dal-mi's misunderstanding into a reality.
 Kim Seon-ho as Han Ji-pyeong 
 Nam Da-reum as young Han Ji-pyeong
 A team leader at SH Venture Capital, his astonishing investment skills and sharp tongue earn him the nickname, “the Gordon Ramsay of investments.” Though he's prickly to most others, he's softer than anyone to one special person who granted him a great favor in the past. An orphan, at the age of 18 he was helped by Seo Dal-mi's grandmother and never forgot her kindness. He used the  fake name of Nam Do-san to write letters to Seo Dal-mi at her grandmother's request.
 Kang Han-na as Won In-jae/Seo In-jae 
 Lee Re as young Won In-jae
 Won In-jae is Seo Dal-mi's older sister. She has everything society respects: a strong educational background, beautiful appearance, and money. She eventually realizes her background as a second-generation chaebol is a weakness and does everything she can to create success on her own and be acknowledged for her skills.

Supporting

Seo Dal-mi and Won In-jae's family
 Kim Hae-sook as Choi Won-deok
 Seo Chung-myung's mother, and Seo Dal-mi and Won In-jae's grandmother.
 Song Seon-mi as Cha Ah-hyun
 Seo Dal-mi and Won In-jae's mother. Having divorced her husband out of impatience with his unstable employment, she ends up marrying the wealthy Won Doo-jung. She ultimately regrets leaving Dal-mi and In-jae’s dad for Doo-Jung as he cheats on her but she finds it hard to give up the luxurious life which he affords her.

 Um Hyo-sup as Won Doo-jung
 Won In-jae's stepfather and the Chairman of The Morning group. He shows a ruthless drive to exert power over others in his drive for business dominance.
 Moon Dong-hyeok as Won Sang-soo
 Won Don-Jung's son, Won In-jae's stepbrother. In a power move, he becomes the Chief Executive Officer of the Morning group.

Samsan Tech
 Yoo Su-bin as Lee Chul-san
A friend of Do-san since they were in university, he joined the company after resigning due to a ransomware that had taken control while he was in-charge and was told to pay 100 million won.
 Kim Do-wan as Kim Yong-san
A friend of Do-san since they were in university, he had his own agenda for getting into Sandbox, relating to the death of his brother who was a CEO at Sandbox's 2nd cohort.
 Stephanie Lee as Jeong Sa-ha
A former lawyer who quits her job to pursue something more adventurous. She speaks fluent English and intersperses English expressions even while speaking Korean with her teammates.

Nam Do-san's family
 Kim Hee-jung as Park Geum-jung
 Nam Do-san's mother.
 Kim Won-hae as Nam Sung-hwan
 Nam Do-san's father.
 Jang Se-hyun as Nam Chun-ho
 Nam Do-san's cousin.

SH Venture Capital
 Seo Yi-sook as Yoon Seon-hak
 The CEO of Sandbox and SH Venture Capital.
 Kim Min-seok as Park Dong-cheon
 The assistant or secretary of Ji-pyeong and mentoring manager of Sandbox's 12th batch.

Others
 Jasper Cho as Alex Kwon
 One of the mentors at Sandbox's 12th batch and the owner of 2STO, a Silicon Valley company.
 Kang Yoo-seok as Shin Hyeon
 A computer programmer, Shin Jeong's twin brother.
 Joo Bo-Young as Shin Jeong
 A computer programmer, Shin Hyeon's twin sister.
 Kim Ji-in as Seo-hyun

Special appearances
 Kim Joo-hun as Seo Chung-myung (ep1)
 Seo Dal-mi's and Won In-jae's father. Having had enough of being degraded at work, he decides to start his own business, which leads to his divorce and after a year, he manages to get a deal and it is implied that he inspired the name "Sandbox" during a chat with the owner who happens to be the current "Sandbox" CEO Yoon Seon-hak. On the very same day, while going home he dies in the bus due to brain injuries from an earlier car accident.
 Yang Dae-hyuk as Yoon Byung-soo (ep9-10)
 Yeo Jin-goo as Jang Young-shil (voice) / Hong Ji-seok (ep16)
 Lee Bo-young as woman at pub
 Moon Se-yoon as security guard
 Park Chan-ho as Nam Do-san's favorite baseball athlete
 Bae Hae-sun as Lee Hye-won, team leader at Seonju Life Insurance.

Original soundtrack

Part 1

Part 2

Part 3

Part 4

Part 5

Part 6

Part 7

Part 8

Part 9

Part 10

Part 11

Part 12

Part 13

Part 14

Part 15

Part 16

Part 17

Episodes

Reception

Critical reception
The South China Morning Post ranked it #10 on its list of "The top 10 K-dramas of 2020". Kim Jae-ha of Teen Vogue including it on the list of the "11 Best K-Dramas of 2020" said that "Start-Up reinforces the idea that no matter how fractured a family is, the ties remain – for better or worse" .

Viewership
The series logged 4.5% in viewership rating for its first episode.

Adaptation
In March 2022, it was announced that GMA Network will produce a Philippine adaptation of the series, whose working title is Start-Up PH, starring Bea Alonzo, in her first television series in GMA Network, and Alden Richards.

Awards and nominations

Notes

References

External links
  
Start-Up at Studio Dragon 
  at HiSTORY D&C 
 
 
 

TVN (South Korean TV channel) television dramas
2020 South Korean television series debuts
2020 South Korean television series endings
Television series by Studio Dragon
South Korean workplace television series
Korean-language Netflix exclusive international distribution programming
Television shows written by Park Hye-ryun